This is a list of number-one dance airplay hits as recorded by Billboard magazine's Dance/Mix Show Airplay chart, a weekly national survey of popular songs based on radio airplay from Dance-formatted radio stations in the United States, as compiled by Billboard exclusively from monitored airplay as tracked by Nielsen Broadcast Data Systems.

Below are links to lists showing the songs that have topped the chart.  Dates shown represent "week-ending" Billboard issue dates.

See also
List of artists who reached number one on the U.S. dance airplay chart